Basler Electric is a manufacturer of power systems products based in Highland, Illinois. The company was founded in 1942 by Carl Basler. 
In 1945, they began producing custom transformers. In 1959, Basler released the SRA voltage regulator.
They also manufacture solid-state and multifunction digital protective relays, generator and engine controls, and static excitation systems.

History
1942 - The company was founded by Carl Basler. 
1945 - start of producing custom transformers.
1947 - Basler Electric Company incorporation.
1959 - Basler introduced the first solid-state voltage regulator, the SRA.
1961 - Basler developed its first Static Excitation System.
1972 - Basler’s first solid-state relay was developed.
1990 - Basler International Group found in Wasselonne, France
early 1990s - Basler started development of a Digital Excitation Control System (DECS range)
2004 - Basler opened facility in Suzhou China 
2006 - Basler acquired the Cutler-Hammer Excitation Control Product Line
2009 - Basler opened facility in Singapore
2012 - Basler acquires a full-service injection molding company - Basler Plastics, LLC.
2017 - Basler acquires E2 Power Systems, LLC and expands it service capabilities to include turnkey engineering.

See also
Electrical generators
Relay
Transformer
Voltage regulator

Notes and references
1. Facilities / Capabilities Report - Basler Electric Company 03-2010

2. Basler Electric Company - https://www.balser.com/About-Us/Company-History

External links
Basler Electric Corporate web site
Authorized representative Basler Electric for Czechia and Slovakia
Basler AG Corporate web site (Unrelated to Basler Electric)
Basler GmbH (Unrelated to Basler Electric)
Basler Versicherungen(Unrelated to Basler Electric)
The Professional Service Providers
Southern Illinois University Edwardsville Controls Lab

Electrical equipment manufacturers
Manufacturing companies based in Illinois
Companies based in Madison County, Illinois